Jinri Park (Hangul: 박진리; Hanja: 朴真理; born April 24, 1988) is a South Korean model, DJ, actress and magazine columnist who is based in the Philippines. Park worked as a DJ at Monster Radio RX 93.1 from 2011–2015 and is starting a career as an actress and TV host.

Television

Webshows

Awards and nominations

FHM Sexiest Woman
Park first appeared on FHM Philippines in May 2011, reappeared again in August 2011 and March 2012, which become as a FHM favorite.
She appeared on the gravure book, The Jinri Experience release by Summit Media, the publisher of FHM, and finally as cover girl in August 2013, as she reached Top 10 in 2014 Sexiest Woman list, and again in 2015

Personal life
In March 22, 2020, Jinri revealed that she married a Filipino-Australian named John, who's not from the entertainment industry, in Sydney, Australia. Since moving, she started work as a waitress and started pursuing Brazilian Jiu Jitsu as an international competitor.

See also
Grace Lee
Sam Oh

References

External links
 
 
 

1988 births
Living people
TV5 (Philippine TV network) personalities
People from Incheon
South Korean expatriates in the Philippines
Filipina gravure idols
Pinoy Big Brother contestants
GMA Network personalities